Malakpet is one of the suburbs in the old city area of Hyderabad, Telangana, India. It is famous for TV tower which was built by Teegala Sree Ramulu. This is further divided into two parts, Old Malakpet and New Malakpet and is traditionally considered part of old city. This circle (6) comes under Charminar Zone of Greater Hyderabad Municipal Corporation. There are seven wards in this circle namely Saidabad (24), Moosrambagh (25), Old Malakpet (26), Akberbagh (27), Azampura (28), Chawani (29) and Dabeerpura (30).

Mutalib Danish of the All India Majlis-e-Ittehadul Muslimeen party was elected MLA of the Malakpet Assembly constituency for the third time in 2018.

History 

It was named after Malik Yaqoub, a servant of the Golconda King Abdullah Qutb Shah, where he lived and had a market.

In 1886 The Hyderabad Race Club was shifted here from Moula Ali, as Asaf Jah VI wanted it to be closer to his palace. Soon, he also built the Mahbub Mansion right by the Race Course.

Locality

Malakpet is a traditional part of Hyderabad. Malakpet is bordered by Amberpet and Moosarambagh in the north, Dilsukhnagar in the east, Chaderghat in the west and Saidabad in the south.

Landmarks

The major landmarks here are the popular Hyderabad Race Club, and also the historic Mahbub Mansion Market or Mahbub Gunj Market. The Asman Garh Palace and Monsieur Raymond's Tomb are other historical places located here.

Apart from historical places, Malakpet also has galleria mall with nearby metro connectivity.

The Palmetum is a specialized botanical garden, featuring only different palm trees. It was established in 2002 by Greater Hyderabad Municipal Corporation.

View point apartment is also located in Malakpet.

Commercial Area

The Nalgonda "X" Roads Junction is a major commercial hub.

Hospitals

Malakpet is home to several well equipped multi-speciality hospitals. Below is a list of major hospitals in the locality:
 M.N. Area Hospital (a Govt. Hospital under Vaidya Vidhana Parishad) (Popularly Known as Police Hospital)
 Susrutha Hospital
 KIMS Bibi Cancer Hospital (Previously Bibi Cancer Hospital)
 Mercure Hospital (Previously Venus Hospital)
 Thumbay Hospital (Previously New Life Hospital)
 Yashoda Hospitals
 Hyderabad Kidney and Laparoscopic center
 Hegde Hospital
 Sri Vani Hospital (formerly Farhat Hospital)

Transport

The state-owned TSRTC runs the city bus service, connecting to all the major centres of the city. All the buses running from Dilsukhnagar and Midhani bus depots pass through Malakpet. There is Malakpet metro station nearby. Malakpet has an MMTS train station, which is used for commuting. The Nalgonda X Road connects the nearby busy areas of Dilsukhnagar and Saidabad and is a hub of huge traffic.  It is also connected by Metro Train with two stations, one at Mahboob Mansion and another at the Malakpet MMTS railway station.

References

Neighbourhoods in Hyderabad, India
Greater Hyderabad Municipal Corporation